Semir Slomić (born 14 January 1988 in Banovići) is a Bosnian retired football player, who played for FK Radnicki Lukavac in the Prva liga FBiH.

Club career 
The forward player played previously in Bosnia for FK Budućnost Banovići, FK Sloboda Tuzla, Jedinstvo Bihać and in the Prva HNL for NK Croatia Sesvete and Dinamo Zagreb.

He returned to hometown club Budućnost in summer 2013 and spent the latter years of his  career in the Austrian amateur leagues.

References

External links
Statistics at 1HNL.net

1988 births
Living people
People from Banovići
Association football forwards
Bosnia and Herzegovina footballers
FK Budućnost Banovići players
FK Sloboda Tuzla players
NK Croatia Sesvete players
NK Jedinstvo Bihać players
FK Radnički Lukavac players
Premier League of Bosnia and Herzegovina players
Croatian Football League players
First League of the Federation of Bosnia and Herzegovina players
Austrian 2. Landesliga players
Bosnia and Herzegovina expatriate footballers
Expatriate footballers in Croatia
Bosnia and Herzegovina expatriate sportspeople in Croatia
Expatriate footballers in Austria
Bosnia and Herzegovina expatriate sportspeople in Austria